Here Comes Carter is a 1936 American comedy film directed by William Clemens and written by Roy Chanslor. The film stars Ross Alexander, Glenda Farrell and Anne Nagel. Last film produced by First National Pictures and released on October 24, 1936. In Britain the film was released under the title "The Voice of Scandal". A radio commentator avenges an old wrong by blowing the whistle on Hollywood scandals.

Plot
Movie studio publicist Kent Carter becomes furious when he believes actor Rex Marchbanks is trying to steal Linda Warren, the girl he loves. Their feud intensifies when Kent replaces radio personality Mel Winter on the air, reporting on Hollywood scandals and repeatedly singling out Rex.

Gangsters become involved, particularly Slugs Dana and Steve Moran, who threaten Kent. In the end, Kent wins Linda back after proving that Rex and Moran are actually brothers as well as crime associates.

Cast       
 Ross Alexander as Kent Carter
 Glenda Farrell as Verna Kennedy
 Anne Nagel as Linda Warren
 Craig Reynolds as Rex Marchbanks
 Hobart Cavanaugh as Mel Winter
 George E. Stone as Boots Burnett
 John Sheehan as Slugs Dana
 Joseph Crehan as Daniel Bronson
 Dennis Moore as Russ McAllen
 William White as Office Boy

Songs
Music and lyrics by M. K. Jerome and Jack Scholl:	
 You on My Mind
 Through the Courtesy of Love

References

External links
 
 
 
 

1936 films
Warner Bros. films
American comedy films
1936 comedy films
Films directed by William Clemens
American black-and-white films
1930s English-language films
1930s American films